Richard Otto may refer to:

 Richard Otto (physician) (1872–1952), German physician and bacteriologist
 Richard Otto (military officer) (active from 1986), Ugandan brigadier

See also
 Richard Otto Maack (1825–1886), Russian naturalist, geographer, and anthropologist
 Richard Otto Zöpffel (1843–1891), Baltic German church historian and theologian